The 2015 UNLV Rebels football team represented the University of Nevada, Las Vegas during the 2015 NCAA Division I FBS football season. The Rebels were led by first-year head coach Tony Sanchez and played their home games at Sam Boyd Stadium. They were members of the West Division of the Mountain West Conference. They finished the season 3–9, 2–6 in Mountain West play to finish in a tie for fourth place in the West Division.

Schedule

Schedule Source:

Game summaries

at Northern Illinois

 Passing leaders: NIU – Drew Hare, 21–26, 360 yards, 2 touchdowns and UNLV – Blake Decker, 21–39, 319 yards, 2 touchdowns, 1 interception
 Rushing leaders: NIU – Joel Bouagnon, 21 carries, 152 yards, 3 touchdowns and UNLV – Keith Whitley, 21 carries, 68 yards
 Receiving leaders: NIU – Kenny Golladay, 9 receptions, 213 yards and UNLV – Devonte Boyd, 5 receptions, 107 yards, 1 touchdown
 Tackling leaders: NIU – Boomer Mays, 13 tackles and UNLV – Peni Vea, 9 tackles

UCLA

 Passing leaders: UCLA – Josh Rosen, 22–42, 223 yards, 1 touchdown and UNLV – Blake Decker, 2–6, 52 yards
 Rushing leaders: UCLA – Paul Perkins, 18 carries, 151 yards, 2 touchdowns and UNLV – Keith Whitley, 12 carries, 73 yards
 Receiving leaders: UCLA – Jordan Payton, 5 receptions, 70 yards, 1 touchdown and UNLV – Devonte Boyd, 3 receptions, 55 yards
 Tackling leaders: UCLA – Kenny Young, 5 tackles and UNLV – Peni Vea, 8 tackles

at Michigan

 Passing leaders: MICH – Jake Rudock, 14–22, 123 yards, 1 touchdown, 1 interception and UNLV – Blake Decker, 8–16, 96 yards, 1 touchdown, 2 interceptions
 Rushing leaders: MICH – Ty Isaac, 8 carries, 114 yards, 1 touchdown and UNLV – Keith Whitley, 13 carries, 29 yards
 Receiving leaders: MICH – Amara Darboh, 4 receptions, 34 yards and UNLV – Devonte Boyd, 3 receptions, 65 yards, 1 touchdown
 Tackling leaders: MICH – Joe Bolden, 6 tackles and UNLV – Tau Lotulelei, 8 tackles

Idaho State

 Passing leaders: ISU – Michael Sanders, 14–33, 164 yards, 1 touchdown, 3 interceptions and UNLV – Blake Decker, 7–11, 99 yards, 2 touchdowns
 Rushing leaders ISU – Xavier Finney, 15 carries, 59 yards and UNLV – Xzaviar Campbell, 9 carries, 139 yards, 2 touchdowns
 Receiving leaders: ISU – Madison Mangum, 8 receptions, 97 yards and UNLV – Kendal Keys, 3 receptions, 30 yards
 Tackling leaders: ISU – Cody Sorenson, 10 tackles and UNLV – Tau Lotulelei, 7 tackles

at Nevada

 Passing leaders: NEV – Tyler Stewart, 20–44, 202 yards, 1 touchdown, 1 interception and UNLV – Blake Decker, 7–11, 86 yards, 1 interception
 Rushing leaders: NEV – Tyler Stewart, 11 carries, 61 yards and UNLV – Keith Whitley, 16 carries, 76 yards, 1 touchdown
 Receiving leaders: NEV – Jerico Richardson, 8 receptions, 87 yards, 1 touchdown and UNLV – Devonte Boyd, 4 receptions, 39 yards
 Tackling leaders: NEV – Matthew Lyons, 12 tackles and UNLV – Blake Richmond, 11 tackles

San Jose State

 Passing leaders: SJSU – Kenny Potter, 30–48, 329 yards, 2 touchdowns, 1 interception and UNLV – Kurt Palandech, 15–30, 217 yards, 2 touchdowns, 2 interceptions
 Rushing leaders: SJSU – Tyler Ervin, 18 carries, 73 yards, 1 touchdown and UNLV – Kurt Palandech, 18 carries, 47 yards
 Receiving leaders: SJSU – Tyler Ervin, 8 receptions, 74 yards, 1 touchdown and UNLV – Kendal Keys, 5 receptions, 84 yards
 Tackling leaders: SJSU – Frank Ginda, 14 tackles and UNLV – Ryan McAleenan, 12 tackles

at Fresno State

 Passing leaders: FS – Kilton Anderson, 19–31, 193 yards and UNLV – Kurt Palandech, 12–24, 111 yards, 2 touchdowns
 Rushing leaders: FS – Marteze Waller, 21 carries, 111 yards, 2 touchdowns and UNLV – Keith Whitley, 17 carries, 98 yards
 Receiving leaders: FS – Jamire Jordan, 5 receptions, 42 yards and UNLV – Keith Whitley, 3 receptions, 14 yards
 Tackling leaders: FS – Ejiro Ederaine, 12 tackles and UNLV – Ryan McAleenan, 10 tackles

Boise State

 Passing leaders: BSU – Brett Rypien, 35–52, 469 yards, 2 touchdowns and UNLV – Blake Decker, 29–50, 357 yards, 2 interceptions
 Rushing leaders: BSU – Jeremy McNichols, 22 carries, 122 yards, 1 touchdown and UNLV – Xzaviar Campbell, 9 carries, 29 yards, 1 touchdown
 Receiving leaders: BSU – Thomas Sperbeck, 10 receptions, 163 yards and UNLV – Devonte Boyd, 10 receptions, 116 yards
 Tackling leaders: BSU – Jonathan Moxey, 9 tackles and UNLV – Blake Richmond, 10 tackles

Hawaii

 Passing leaders: UH – Ikaika Woolsey, 16–33, 187 yards, 2 touchdowns, 1 interception and UNLV – Blake Decker, 15–24, 258 yards, 2 touchdowns, 1 interception
 Rushing leaders: UH – Paul Harris, 20 carries, 192 yards, 1 touchdown and UNLV – Keith Whitley, 21 carries, 124 yards, 1 touchdown
 Receiving leaders: UH – Devan Stubblefield, 5 receptions, 27 yards and UNLV – Devonte Boyd, 6 receptions, 120 yards, 1 touchdown
 Tackling leaders: UH – Julian Gener, 11 tackles and UNLV – Tau Lotulelei, 12 tackles

at Colorado State

 Passing leaders: CSU – Nick Stevens, 13–19, 209 yards, 4 touchdowns, 1 interception and UNLV – Blake Decker, 13–19, 176 yards, 2 touchdowns
 Rushing leaders: CSU – Dalyn Dawkins, 19 carries, 151 yards and UNLV – Lexington Thomas, 11 carries, 118 yards, 1 touchdown
 Receiving leaders: CSU – Rashard Higgins, 7 receptions, 102 yards, 3 touchdown and UNLV – Devonte Boyd, 8 receptions, 131 yards
 Tackling leaders: CSU – Deonte Clyburn, 12 tackles and UNLV – Blake Richmond, 10 tackles

San Diego State

 Passing leaders: SDSU – Maxwell Smith, 11–17, 107 yards, 1 touchdown and UNLV – Kurt Palandech, 18–35, 190 yards, 2 touchdowns, 2 interceptions
 Rushing leaders: SDSU – Donnel Pumphrey, 14 carries, 139 yards, 2 touchdowns and UNLV – Lexington Thomas, 3 carries, 42 yards
 Receiving leaders: SDSU – Chase Price, 2 receptions, 30 yards, 1 touchdown and UNLV – Kendal Keys, 8 receptions, 76 yards, 1 touchdown
 Tackling leaders: SDSU – Calvin Munson, 9 tackles and UNLV – Kimble Jenson, 13 tackles

at Wyoming

 Passing leaders: UNLV – Blake Decker, 18–33, 270 yards, 3 touchdowns, 1 interception and WYO – Cameron Coffman, 14–24, 248 yards, 3 touchdowns, 1 interception
 Rushing leaders: UNLV – Xzaviar Campbell, 9 carries, 87 yards and WYO – Brian Hill, 35 carries, 232 yards, 1 touchdown
 Receiving leaders: UNLV – Devonte Boyd, 6 receptions, 122 yards, 1 touchdown and WYO – Jacob Hollister, 5 receptions, 119 yards, 1 touchdown
 Tackling leaders: UNLV – Kimble Jensen, 14 tackles and WYO – Marcus Epps, 10 tackles

References

UNLV
UNLV Rebels football seasons
UNLV Rebels football